Scardinius graecus, also called the Greek rudd or Yliki rudd, is a species of cyprinid  fish, only known from a single lake, Lake Yliki, in Greece. The other known population, in Lake Paralimni, disappeared after the lake had been drained. This fish is classified as critically endangered.

References

Sources
 

Scardinius
Fish described in 1937
Taxonomy articles created by Polbot
Taxa named by Alexander I. Stephanidis